Natasja Oerlemans (born 30 November 1969 in Rotterdam) is head Food & Agriculture at World Wide Fund for Nature (WWF) Netherlands. She was a prominent member of the Party for the Animals.

She stood as a candidate for the European Parliament in the 2009 election.

She is a vegetarian.

See also
 List of animal rights advocates

References

1969 births
Living people
Dutch agronomists
Politicians from Rotterdam
Wageningen University and Research alumni